Roz Chast (born November 26, 1954) is an American cartoonist and a staff cartoonist for The New Yorker. Since 1978, she has published more than 800 cartoons in The New Yorker. She also publishes cartoons in Scientific American and the Harvard Business Review.

In recognition of her work, Comics Alliance listed Chast as one of twelve women cartoonists deserving of lifetime achievement recognition. She was elected to the American Philosophical Society in 2010. In May 2017, she received the Alumni Award for Artistic Achievement at the Rhode Island School of Design commencement ceremony.

Early life and education
Chast grew up in the Flatbush section of Brooklyn, the only child of George Chast, a high school French and Spanish teacher, and Elizabeth, an assistant principal in an elementary school. Her Jewish parents were children during the Great Depression, and she has spoken about their extreme frugality. She graduated from Midwood High School in Brooklyn, and attended Kirkland College (which later merged with Hamilton College). She studied at the Rhode Island School of Design and received a BFA in painting in 1977. She also holds honorary doctorates from Pratt Institute, Dartmouth College, and the Art Institute of Boston at Lesley University; and is a member of the American Academy of Arts and Sciences.

Career
Chast's subjects often deal with domestic and family life. In a 2006 interview with comedian Steve Martin for the New Yorker Festival, Chast revealed that she enjoys drawing interior scenes, often involving lamps and accentuated wallpaper, to serve as the backdrop for her comics. Her comics reflect a "conspiracy of inanimate objects", an expression she credits to her mother.

Her first New Yorker cartoon, Little Things, was sold to the magazine in April 1978. The cartoon, which Chast describes as "peculiar and personal", shows a small collection of "Little Things"—strangely-named, oddly-shaped small objects such as "chent", "spak", and "tiv".

Her New Yorker cartoons began as small black-and-white panels, but increasingly used more color and often appear over several pages. Her first cover for The New Yorker was the August 4, 1986 issue.

Chast has written or illustrated more than a dozen books, including Unscientific Americans, Parallel Universes, Mondo Boxo, Proof of Life on Earth, The Four Elements and The Party After You Left: Collected Cartoons 1995–2003 (Bloomsbury, 2004). In 2006, Theories of Everything: Selected Collected and Health-Inspected Cartoons, 1978–2006 was published, collecting most of her cartoons from The New Yorker and other periodicals. One characteristic of her books is that the "author photo" is always a cartoon she draws of, presumably, herself. The title page, including the Library of Congress cataloging information, is also hand-lettered by Chast.

Her book Can't We Talk About Something More Pleasant? is a graphic memoir, combining cartoons, text, and photographs to tell the story of an only child helping her elderly parents navigate the end of their lives.

Chast is represented by the Danese/Corey gallery in Chelsea, New York City.

Personal life
Chast lives in Ridgefield, Connecticut with her husband, humor writer Bill Franzen. They have two children.

Exhibitions 
 "The Masters Series: Roz Chast" at School of Visual Arts in New York City (2018)
 "Cartoon Memoirs" at the Contemporary Jewish Museum (2017)
 "Cartoon Memoirs" at the Museum of the City of New York (2016)
 "Cartoon Memoirs" at the Norman Rockwell Museum (2015)

Awards
 2012 NYC Literary Honor in Humor
 2013 Inducted, American Academy of Arts and Sciences
 2014 Kirkus Prize winner for Can't We Talk About Something More Pleasant?
 2014 National Book Critics Circle Award (Autobiography) winner for Can't We Talk About Something More Pleasant?
 2015 Reuben Award, Cartoonist of the Year National Cartoonists Society
 2015 20th Annual Heinz Award for the Arts and Humanities 
 2018 Harvey Award Hall of Fame inductee

Bibliography

Articles and comic strips

Books
 
 
 Three small books (Kathryn Markel, 1982)
 Parallel Universes: Cartoons (Harper, 1984) 
 Poems and Songs (Ink, Inc., 1985) 
 Mondo Boxo (Harper, 1987) 
 The Four Elements (Harper, 1988) 
 Proof of Life on Earth (Harper, 1991) 
 Childproof (Hyperion, 1997) 
 The Party, After You Left (Bloomsbury, 2004) 
 Theories of Everything: Selected, Collected, and Health-Inspected Cartoons, 1978-2006 (Bloomsbury, 2008) 
 Too Busy Marco (Atheneum, 2010) 
 What I Hate: From A to Z (Bloomsbury, 2011) 
 A Friend for Marco (Atheneum, 2012) 
 Marco Goes to School (Atheneum, 2012) 
 Can't We Talk About Something More Pleasant? (Bloomsbury, 2014) 
 Roz Chast: Cartoon Memoirs (Norman Rockwell Museum, 2015)
 Around the Clock (Atheneum, 2015) 
 The Best American Comics 2016 (editor) (Houghton Mifflin Harcourt, 2016) 
 Going Into Town: A Love Letter to New York (Bloomsbury, 2017) 
 Marx, Patricia. You Can Only Yell at Me for One Thing at a Time (illustrated by Roz Chast), (New York: Celadon Books, 2020)

References

Further reading 
  (Online version is titled "Scenes from the life of Roz Chast")

External links

Video: Roz Chast interview with comedian Steve Martin at the 2006 New Yorker Festival
Interview with Roz Chast in Newsday, 2006
Interview with Roz Chast in New York Times, 2006
Interview with Roz Chast on NPR's "Fresh Air," 2014.

1954 births
American female comics artists
American women cartoonists
American magazine illustrators
The New Yorker cartoonists
Jewish American artists
Jewish humorists
Rhode Island School of Design alumni
People from Flatbush, Brooklyn
People from Ridgefield, Connecticut
Midwood High School alumni
Women humorists
Harvey Award winners
Members of the American Philosophical Society
Kirkus Prize winners
American cartoonists
Living people